From Ashes to New is an American rock band from Lancaster, Pennsylvania. The band's lineup frequently shifted in its early years, musician Matt Brandyberry being the founding and sole constant member of the group. The band has released three studio albums, Day One (2016), The Future (2018), and Panic (2020). They have found moderate success with some of their singles, including "Through It All", "Crazy", and "Panic", which reached peaks of 6, 3, and 11, respectively, on the Billboard Mainstream Rock chart.

History 
From Ashes to New was formed in 2013 in Lancaster, Pennsylvania, releasing their debut single, "My Fight", followed by an eponymous extended play. In 2015, they released a second extended play, Downfall, as a taste of their debut album, set to be released in 2016. Day One was released on February 26, 2016. A deluxe edition of the album was released exclusively online on November 18, 2016. It includes an acoustic version of "Lost and Alone" as well as other new tracks. This deluxe edition was exclusively digital, with no Compact Disc or LP Record versions available.

The band has also recorded a song with CFO$, "Hail the Crown", the main theme song for WWE 205 Live.

In December 2016, they began recording for their second studio album. On March 11, 2017, it was announced that drummer Tim D'onofrio and lead vocalist Chris Musser had decided to leave the band, and that Mat Madiro had stepped in as their new drummer. The band began looking for a new lead singer through social media websites. After a series of auditions submitted by fans, Danny Case (formerly of Vanity Strikes) was revealed to have been chosen as the new lead singer on July 13, 2017.

On February 1, 2018, the band released "Crazy", the first single from their upcoming album The Future. The full album was released on April 20, 2018. The album debuted at number 163 on the Billboard 200 chart.

On October 4, 2019, a remix of The Hu's "Yuve Yuve Yu" was released, featuring new vocals by Case.

Musical style and influences

From Ashes to New has been described as rap metal, nu metal, rap rock, and alternative metal. The band's music also features elements of genres such as alternative rock, punk rock, hard rock, heavy metal, hip hop, electronicore, and electronica.

The band's influences include Bone Thugs-n-Harmony, Korn, Linkin Park, Skrillex, Sevendust, Breaking Benjamin, Eminem, DMX, Drag-On, Pantera, Glassjaw, Alexisonfire, Alice in Chains, Of Mice & Men.

Band members 

Current
 Danny Case – lead vocals (2017–present)
 Matt Brandyberry – rap vocals, keyboards, synthesizers, programming (2013–present), clean vocals (2017), bass, rhythm guitar (2017–present), lead guitar (2013)
 Lance Dowdle – lead guitar, bass (2015–present)
 Mat Madiro – drums, percussion (2017–present)

Former
 Jon-Mikel Valudes – drums, percussion (2013–2014)
 Dan Kecki – lead guitar (2013–2015)
 Garrett Russell – bass (2013–2015)
 Chris Musser – clean vocals (2013–2017)
 Branden Kreider – rhythm guitar, unclean vocals (2013–2017), bass (2015–2017)
 Tim D'onofrio – drums, percussion (2014–2017)

Timeline

Discography

Studio albums

Extended plays 
From Ashes to New (2013)
Downfall (EP) (2015)
Quarantine Chronicles, Vol. 1 (2021)
Quarantine Chronicles, Vol. 2 (2021)
Quarantine Chronicles, Vol. 3 (2021)

Singles

Music videos

References

External links 
 

American nu metal musical groups
American electronic rock musical groups
Rap metal musical groups
2013 establishments in Pennsylvania
Musical groups established in 2013
Rock music groups from Pennsylvania
Lancaster, Pennsylvania
Musical quartets
Alternative rock groups from Pennsylvania